Neapolitan is a Romance language of the Italo-Dalmatian group spoken across much of mainland Southern Italy (except for southern Calabria and southern Apulia), and spoken in a small part of Central Italy (the province of Ascoli Piceno in the Marche). It is named after the Kingdom of Naples, which once covered most of the area, since the city of Naples was its capital. On 14 October 2008, a law by the Region of Campania stated that Neapolitan was to be protected.

The term "Neapolitan language" is used broadly in this article to refer to the group of closely-related Romance dialects found in southern continental Italy, as described above. However, as the term itself implies, in contexts ranging from colloquial speech to academic linguistics, Neapolitan, napulitano or napoletano may refer instead to the specific Romance varieties spoken natively in Naples and the immediately surrounding Naples metropolitan area.

Distribution 

In the broad view adopted here, the Neapolitan dialects are distributed throughout most of continental southern Italy, historically united during the Kingdom of Naples and the Kingdom of the Two Sicilies, specifically southern Lazio (Gaeta and Sora districts), southern Marche, Abruzzo, Molise, Basilicata, Campania (Naples), northern and central Apulia, and northernmost Calabria. The dialects are part of a varied dialect continuum, so the varieties in southern Lazio, Marche, Abruzzo, Molise, Apulia, Lucania and Calabria can typically be recognizable as regional groups of dialects. In western Abruzzo and Lazio, the dialects give way to Central Italian dialects such as Romanesco. The dialects in central Calabria and southern Apulia give way to the Sicilian language.

Largely due to massive Southern Italian migration in the late 19th century and 20th century, there are also a number of Neapolitan speakers in Italian diaspora communities in the United States, Canada, Australia, Brazil, Argentina, Uruguay, Mexico, and Venezuela. However, in the United States, traditional Neapolitan has had considerable contact with English and the Sicilian languages spoken by Sicilian and Calabrian immigrants living alongside Neapolitan-speaking immigrants and so the Neapolitan in the US is now significantly different from the contemporary Neapolitan spoken in Naples. English words are often used in place of Neapolitan words, especially among second-generation speakers. On the other hand, the effect of Standard Italian on Neapolitan in Italy has been similar because of the increasing displacement of Neapolitan by Standard Italian in daily speech.

The following dialects constitute Neapolitan; numbers refer to the map:

The southernmost regions of Italy—most of Calabria, southern Apulia, and southern Salerno (Cilento region) as well as Sicily—are home to Sicilian rather than Neapolitan.

Classification 

Neapolitan is a Romance language and is generally considered one of the Italo-Romance branch of the Italo-Dalmatian languages. There are notable differences among the various dialects, but they are all generally mutually intelligible.

Italian and Neapolitan are of variable mutual comprehensibility, depending on affective and linguistic factors. There are notable grammatical differences, such as Neapolitan having nouns in the neuter form and a unique plural formation, as well as historical phonological developments, which often obscure the cognacy of lexical items.

Its evolution has been similar to that of Italian and other Romance languages from their roots in Vulgar Latin. It may reflect a pre-Latin Oscan substratum, as in the pronunciation of the d sound as an r sound (rhotacism) at the beginning of a word or between two vowels: e.g. doje (feminine) or duje (masculine), meaning "two", is pronounced, and often spelled, as roje/ruje; vedé ("to see") as veré, and often spelled so; also cadé/caré ("to fall") and Madonna/Maronna).
Other effects of the Oscan substratum are postulated, but substratum claims are highly controversial. As in many other languages in the Italian Peninsula, Neapolitan has an adstratum greatly influenced by other Romance languages (Catalan, Spanish and Franco-Provençal above all), Germanic languages and Greek (both ancient and modern).

Neapolitan has enjoyed a rich literary, musical and theatrical history (notably Giambattista Basile, Eduardo Scarpetta, his son Eduardo De Filippo, Salvatore Di Giacomo and Totò). Thanks to this heritage and the musical work of Renato Carosone in the 1950s, Neapolitan is still in use in popular music, even gaining national popularity in the songs of Pino Daniele and the Nuova Compagnia di Canto Popolare.

The language has no official status within Italy and is not taught in schools. The University of Naples Federico II offers (from 2003) courses in Campanian Dialectology at the faculty of Sociology, whose actual aim is not to teach students to speak the language but to study its history, usage, literature and social role. There are also ongoing legislative attempts at the national level to have it recognized as an official minority language of Italy. It is a recognized ISO 639 Joint Advisory Committee language with the language code of nap.

Here is the IPA pronunciation of the Neapolitan spoken in the city of Naples:

Alphabet and pronunciation 
Neapolitan orthography consists of 22 Latin letters. Much like Italian orthography, it does not contain k, w, x, or y even though these letters might be found in some foreign words; unlike Italian, it does contain the letter j. The following English pronunciation guidelines are based on General American pronunciation, and the values used may not apply to other dialects. (See also: International Phonetic Alphabet chart for English dialects.)

All Romance languages are closely related. Although Neapolitan shares a high degree of its vocabulary with Italian, the official language of Italy, differences in pronunciation often make the connection unrecognizable to those without knowledge of Neapolitan. The most striking phonological difference is the Neapolitan weakening of unstressed vowels into schwa (schwa is pronounced like the a in about or the u in upon). This is not Neapolitan properly, but rather a mere difference in Italian pronunciation.

Therefore, while pronunciation presents the strongest barrier to comprehension, the grammar of Neapolitan is what sets it apart from Italian. In Neapolitan, for example, the gender and number of a word is expressed by a change in the accented vowel, whereas in Italian it is expressed by a change in the final vowel (e.g. luongo , longa ; Italian lungo, lunga; masc. "long", fem. "long"). These and other morpho-syntactic differences distinguish the Neapolitan language from the Italian language and the Neapolitan accent.

Neapolitan has had a significant influence on the intonation of Rioplatense Spanish, of the Buenos Aires region of Argentina, and the whole of Uruguay.

Vowels 
While there are only five graphic vowels in Neapolitan, phonemically, there are eight.  Stressed vowels e and o can be either "closed" or "open" and the pronunciation is different for the two.  The grave accent (à, è, ò) is used to denote open vowels, and the acute accent (é, í, ó, ú) is used to denote closed vowels, with alternative ì and ù.  However, accent marks are not commonly used in the actual spelling of words except when they occur on the final syllable of a word, such as Totò, arrivà, or pecché, and when they appear here in other positions, it is only to demonstrate where the stress, or accent, falls in some words. Also, the circumflex is used to mark a long vowel where it wouldn't normally occur (e.g. sî "you are").

Consonants

Digraphs and trigraphs 
The following clusters are always geminated if vowel-following.

Grammar

Definite articles 
The Neapolitan classical definite articles (corresponding to the English word "the") are la (feminine singular), lo (masculine singular) and li (plural for both), but in reality these forms will probably only be found in older literature (along with lu and even el), of which there is much to be found.  Modern Neapolitan uses, almost entirely, shortened forms of these articles:

Before a word beginning with a consonant:

These definite articles are always pronounced distinctly.

Before a word beginning with a vowel, l’ or ll’ are used 
for both masculine and feminine, singular and plural. Although both forms can be found, the ll’ form is by far the most common.

It is well to note that in Neapolitan, the gender of a noun is not easily determined by the article, so other means must be used.  In the case of ’o, which can be either masculine singular or neuter singular (there is no neuter plural in Neapolitan), the initial consonant of the noun is doubled when it is neuter.  For example, the name of a language in Neapolitan is always neuter, so if we see ’o nnapulitano we know it refers to the Neapolitan language, whereas ’o napulitano would refer to a Neapolitan man.

Likewise, since ’e can be either masculine or feminine plural, when it is feminine plural, the initial consonant of the noun is doubled.  For example, consider ’a lista, which in Neapolitan is feminine singular for "list."  In the plural, it becomes ’e lliste.

There can also be problems with nouns whose singular form ends in e.  Since plural nouns usually end in e whether masculine or feminine, the masculine plural is often formed by orthographically changing the spelling.  As an example, consider the word guaglione (which means "boy" or "girl" in the feminine form):

More will be said about these orthographically changing nouns in the section on Neapolitan nouns.

A couple of notes about consonant doubling:

Doubling is a function of the article (and certain other words), and these same words may be seen in other contexts without the consonant doubled.  More will be said about this in the section on consonant doubling.
Doubling only occurs when a vowel follows the consonant.  No doubling occurs if it is followed by another consonant, such as in the word spagnuolo (Spanish).

Indefinite articles 
The Neapolitan indefinite articles, corresponding to the English a or an, are presented in the following table:

Verbal conjugation 
In Neapolitan there are four finite moods: indicative, subjunctive, conditional and imperative, and three non-finite modes: infinitive, gerund and participle. Each mood has an active and a passive form. "to have", It. avere), which contrasts with Italian, in which the intransitive and reflexive verbs take èssere for their auxiliary. For example, we have:

Doubled initial consonants 
In Neapolitan, many times the initial consonant of a word is doubled.  This is called raddoppiamento sintattico in Italian as it also applies to the Italian phonology.
 All feminine plural nouns, preceded by the feminine plural definite article, ’e, or any feminine plural adjective, have their initial consonant doubled.
 All neuter singular nouns, when preceded by the neuter singular definite article, ’o, or by a neuter singular adjective, have their initial consonant doubled.
 In addition, other words also trigger this doubling. Below is a list of words that trigger the doubling of the initial consonant of the following word.
However, when there is a pause after the "trigger" word, the phonological doubling does not occur (e.g. tu sî (g)guaglione, [You are a boy], where sî is a "trigger" word causing doubling of the initial consonant in guaglione but in the phrase ’e do sî, guaglió? [Where are you from, boy?] no doubling occurs). Neither does doubling occur when the initial consonant is followed by another consonant (e.g. ’o ttaliano [the Italian language], but ’o spagnuolo [the Spanish language], where ’o is the neuter definite article).
This is what happens phonologically, and no orthographic change is required. The same thing happens in Italian, where multiple words trigger first-consonant doubling, e.g. la casa but a (c)casa, io e (t)te, etc.

Words that trigger doubling in pronunciation 

 The conjunctions e and né but not o (e.g. pane e ccaso; né (p)pane né (c)caso; but pane o caso)
 The prepositions a, pe, cu (e.g. a (m)me; pe (t)te; cu (v)vuje)
 The negation nu, short for nun (e.g. nu ddicere niente)
 The indefinites ogne, cocche (e.g. ogne (c)casa; cocche (c)cosa)
 Interrogative che and relative che but not ca (e.g. che (p)piense? che (f)femmena! che (c)capa!)
 accussí (e.g. accussí (b)bello)
 From the verb "essere," so’; sî; è but not songo (e.g. je so’ (p)pazzo; tu sî (f)fesso; chella è (M)Maria; chilli so’ (c)cafune but chilli songo cafune)
 chiú (e.g. chiú (p)poco)
 The number tre (e.g. tre (s)segge)
 The neuter definite article ’o (e.g. ’o (p)pane, but nu poco ’e pane)
 The neuter pronoun ’o (e.g. ’o (t)tiene ’o (p)pane?)
 Demonstrative adjectives chistu and chillu which refer to neuter nouns in indefinite quantities (e.g. chistu (f)fierro; chillu (p)pane) but not in definite quantities (e.g. Chistu fierro; chillu pane)
 The feminine plural definite article ’e (e.g. ’e (s)segge; ’e (g)guaglione)
 The plural feminine pronoun ’e (’e (g)guaglione ’e (c)chiamme tu?)
 The plural masculine pronoun ’e preceding a verb, but not a noun (’e guagliune ’e (c)chiamme tu?)
 The locative lloco (e.g. lloco (s)sotto)
 From the verb stà: sto’ (e.g. sto’ (p)parlanno)
 From the verb puté: può; pô (e.g. isso pô (s)sapé)
 Special case Spiritu (S)Santo

See also 

Languages of Italy
Sicilian language
Languages of Calabria

References

Additional sources 
 
 
 
  First Course of Neapolitan Language according to the QCER CEFR with the Patronage of City of Naples realized by Dr.Massimiliano Verde "Corso di Lingua e Cultura Napoletana" with a document of study in Neapolitan Language by Dr.Verde 
First public document in Neapolitan Language of the XXI century according to a text of Dr.Verde; the touristic Map of the III Municipality of Naples in Neapolitan Language:

External links 

Neapolitan recognized by UNESCO 
Websters Online Dictionary Neapolitan–English
Interactive Map of languages in Italy
Neapolitan on-line radio station
Neapolitan glossary on Wiktionary
Italian-Neapolitan searchable online dictionary
Neapolitan basic lexicon at the Global Lexicostatistical Database
Grammar primer and extensive vocabulary for the Neapolitan dialect of Torre del Greco
Neapolitan language and culture 
Prosodic detail in Neapolitan Italian by Francesco Cangemi. Berlin: Language Science Press. pp. 187 Free download.
Consegnato il primo Certificato Europeo di Lingua Napoletana 

 
Italo-Dalmatian languages
Languages of Campania
Languages of Calabria
Languages of Molise
Languages of Apulia
Languages of le Marche
Languages of Abruzzo